General Canuto A. Neri is one of the 81 municipalities of Guerrero, in south-western Mexico. The municipal seat lies at Acapetlahuaya.  The municipality covers an area of 300.4 km².

In 2005, the municipality had a total population of 6,394.

References

Municipalities of Guerrero